Cyclostrema subexcavatum is a species of sea snail, a marine gastropod mollusk in the family Liotiidae.

Description
(Original description by G.W. Tryon) The height of the shell attains 2.2 mm. The umbilicus is wide, perspective and shallow. The shell is whitish under a yellowish brown, membraneous epidermis. The spire is scarcely raised.  The  4 whorls increase rather slowly until the last, which is rather large. The suture is broadly, angularly impressed. A little below the suture there is a bluntly angulated spiral keel. And on the middle of the base, towards the oblique aperture there is another keel. The thin peristome is simple.

Distribution
This marine species occurs off Puerto Rico at a depth of about 700 m.

References

 Watson, R. B. 1886. Report on the Scaphopoda and Gasteropoda collected by H.M.S. Challenger during the years 1873-1876. Report on the Scientific Results of the Voyage of H.M.S. Challenger, Zoology 15(2): i-v, 1-680, 692-756, 50 pls. Her Majesty's Government: London

External links
 To Biodiversity Heritage Library (1 publication)
 To Encyclopedia of Life
 To World Register of Marine Species

subexcavatum
Gastropods described in 1888